Princess Aubergine (Baingan Bádsháhzádí) is an Indian folktale collected by Flora Annie Steel and sourced from the Punjab region. It concerns a princess whose lifeforce is tied to a necklace, and, as soon as it falls in the hand of a rival, the princess falls into a death-like sleep - comparable to heroines of European fairy tales Snow White and Sleeping Beauty.

Source
Richard Carnac Temple sourced the tale from an old woman of Purbia origin, at Kasur near Lahor.

Summary
A poor Brahman and his wife live in such a state of poverty, they resort to gathering roots and herbs to eat. One day, the Brahman finds an eggplant and brings it home to plant. He and his wife water it and it yields a large, purple fruit. The Brahman's wife takes a knife to cut open the large eggplant in the garden. When she stabs the large fruit, a low moan is heard. The wife stabs it again and a voice inside it the eggplant begs for the woman to be careful. The wife opens the eggplant and finds a little maiden inside, dressed in white and purple garments. The Brahman and his wife decide to adopt the girl as their daughter and name her Princess Aubergine.

Next to the Brahman's hut, a king lives with his queen and seven sons. One day, a slave-girl from the palace goes to the Brahman's hut to ask for some light, and sees Princess Aubergine. So lovely is she, that the slave-girl rushes back to the palace to tell the queen about her. The queen, despite being beautiful herself, is told that the Brahman's daughter is even more beautiful than her, and fears the king will replace her.

So the queen devises a plan: she invites Princess Aubergine to the palace, and convinces the girl to live there with her as the queen's sister. Time passes, and the Queen, adept in the arts of magic, learns through her powers that the Princess Aubergine is a fairy, and, while the maiden is asleep, casts spells on her to reveal the location of her lifeforce. The Princess murmurs that her lifeforce is in the queen's first son; by killing him, the queen will kill Aubergine.

The queen kills her firstborn son, and sends the servant-girl to check on Princess Aubergine, who is still alive. Failing her first attempt to kill the maiden, the queen goes back to enchanting the girl for her to disclose her secret. The princess keeps telling that her lifeforce lies in each of the queen's other sons, which are killed every time.

After all her sons have been killed, the queen, fueled with rage, manages to enchant Aubergine with even more powerful spells for her to reveal the location of her lifeforce: in a nine-lakh necklace, inside a tiny box, inside a bumblebee, inside a red and green fish that lives in a river somewhere far away.

The queen convinces her husband, the king, to procure her the nine-lakh necklace, like some sort of comfort due to the sudden loss of their sons, who, according to the queen, have died of a "mysterious illness". The king brings back the fish and the queen finds the fabled necklace. Meanwhile, Princess Aubergine, sensing her approaching death, goes back to her adoptive parents' hut and tells the Brahman to prepare her resting place: they must not bury her, but set her on her bed, deep in the wilderness, surround it with flowers, and build a mudwall around it.

The Brahman and his wife follow her instructions, and the queen's slave-girl reports back that Aubergine is not buried, by lies out in the open. The queen contents herself with this small victory, since she still has the necklace.

One day, the king decides to go on a hunt to occupy his mind off the loss of his seven sons, but the queen warns him against hunting in the north. The king hunts in the east, in the west, and in the south, and, out of options, begins to hunt in the north. The king sees the mudwall and the bed of flowers that surround Princess Aubergine's body. The king becomes entranced by her beauty and begins a long, secret vigil on her body. After a year, a son appears next to the maiden's body, and, some time later, the boy tells the king his mother, the maiden, comes alive at night to care for him, and dies in the morning.

The king then asks the boy about his origins, and the boy answers that he is the king's son and Aubergine's, sent to console him after the death of the king's seven sons by the hands of the queen. The boy also reveals that Aubergine can be revived by retrieving the nine-lakh necklace around the queen's neck, but he is the only one that can get it.

The king brings the boy with him to the palace. The queen, seeing the boy, tries to give him poisoned food, but the boy refuses to touch the food until the queen gives him the necklace to play. The queen, wanting to see the boy eat the food, gives him the necklace, and he hurries back to his mother Aubergine to revive her.

Upon placing the necklace on his mother, Princess Aubergine awakens. The king goes to her and talks her into coming to the palace with him and becoming his bride, but Aubergine refuses, until the king digs up a ditch, fills it with snakes and scorpions, and throws the queen inside it. The king orders some servants to fulfill her orders, then tells the king to come see something with him. Despite refusing, the queen is seized by the guards, tied up, thrown in the ditch and buried alive. Princess Aubergine and her son come to live in the palace with the king.

Analysis

Tale type
The tale is classified in the international Aarne-Thompson-Uther Index as tale type ATU 412, "The Maiden (Youth) with a Separable Soul in a Necklace". Folklorist Stith Thompson included in the same tale type stories about a heroine and a hero whose soul lies in a magical necklace.

Motifs
The tale contains the motif E711.4, "Soul in necklace".

Richard C. Temple stated that the original name of the tale, also known as baingan, bingan, begun and bhâņṭâ, refers to the plant Solanum melongena, that is, the eggplant or the aubergine.

Variants

India
Richard C. Temple noted that the tale "abound[ed] in various forms in the Pânjâb". In the second revision of the index, published in 1961, Stith Thompson located 7 variants in India.

In an Indian tale titled Princess Brinjal, a poor gardener asks a Koiri for alms, and is given a brinjal. The gardener's goes home, places the brinjal in a pot and cooks it. A rattle inside the pot draws the gardener's attention and he opens the pot to see a fairy (peri) and a "heavenly mansion" inside it. The princess introduces herself as "Princess Brinjal" and turns the gardener's poor hut in a grand palace, and they live together. Some time later, a Anir's wife goes to the Princess Brinjal and gives her some milk and curds, and is paid with a pearl. She goes to the Rája's palace to sell milk and curds, and is given wheat husks. She comments to a gatekeeper about Princess Brinjal's generosity, and the gatekeeper tells the Ráni about it. The Ráni fears her husband might want Brinjal as his new wife and decides to poison her. She goes to Brinjal's palace, who invites her in, despite knowing her plan. The Ráni, in turn, invites Brinjal to her palace, but she asks for the Ráni to pave a road between their palaces and decorate it with curtains, so that no man can see her. Princess Brinjal goes to the Ráni's palace. The Ráni tries to poison the princess with the food, but the princess declines to eat any dish. However, goaded by the Ráni, the princess tells her about a ruby necklace inside a box, located on the branches of a pipal tree. After the princess leaves, the Ráni asks her husband to get he necklace. He does and Princess Brinjal falls dead. Before she dies, she asks the gardener to build a tomb and lay her there. Time passes, and the Rája visits Brinjal's resting place. He drinks some water and eats half of a pomegranate. The same night, Brinjal awakens and eats the other half. She and the Rája fall in love and have a son. Brinjal tells the Ráj about the necklace; he takes it back from the Ráni and executes her, making Brinjal his new queen. The tale was sourced to a person named Ali Sajjad, a village accountant from Mirzapur, and collected by Pandit Ram Gharib Chaube, and also noted to be an "imperfect version" of Princess Aubergine.

Author M. N. Venkataswami collected an Indian tale titled The Fakeer's Daughter and the Wicked Queen. In this tale, a poor fakeer is visited by an even poorer fakeer in search of alms. The first fakeer's daughter becomes irritated with the second fakeer's insistence and drops a ladle of hot keer on the second fakeer's head, creating a blister on his hand. The second fakeer is instructed by the "angels from heaven" to let the blister be and, nine months later, a baby girl sprouts from the blister and asks for nourishing. The girl grows up and becomes a beautiful maiden. The rani of the place learns of the maiden's beauty, far surpassing her own, and decides to get rid of her, so she sends some servants to meet the maiden. The servants notice the "carcanet" (a collar) of jewels around her neck and, after a denied polite request, they take the jewels by force and bring them to the Rani. After the carcanet is hung up in the queen's room, the maiden dies. Her father, the second fakeer, is warned in a dream to place the body out in the open, under a sandalwood tree. Next to the body, flowers sprout and their fragrance draws the Raja to the maiden's resting place. He goes to pluck a beeda and eat, but four invisible paris ask him to bring back the jewels from the queen's room. The Raja takes the carcanet and places it on the sleeping maiden, who comes back to life, gives the beeda to the Raja and marries him, while the Rani is executed.

Egypt
Folklorist Howard Schwartz published a Jewish-Egyptian tale titled The Wonder Child: a rabbi and his wife pray to God to have a child. One night, at midnight, during Shevuoth, they pray to God. The rabbi's wife has a dream about a girl clutching a jewel in her hand, and a voice tells her that the child and the jewel can never be parted. Nine months later, she gives birth to a girl with a jewel, and names her Kohava ("star"). The rabbi also places the jewel inside a necklace. Kohava grows up to be a lovely and talented maiden. One day, the queen announces she will go to the bath house, and invites every woman. Kohava insists she wants to visit the bath house. Kohava goes to the bath house and draws everyone's attention due to her beauty. Even the queen notices she is more beautiful then herself, and fear her son, the prince, will wish to marry her. So the queen orders her servants to bring instruments for the girl to play, which she does with ease. Astonished by her talents, the queen convinces the girl's parents to take her to the palace as one of her musicians. Kohava's mother advises her daughter never to take the necklace off her. After they reach the palace, the queen orders Kohava to be sent to prison, so she can perish there, but a guard gives her food. A while later, the queen goes to check on Kohava, and sees she is still alive, but notices the glowing necklace. The queen takes the necklace by force and the girl falls asleep. The queen orders the guard to dispose of the body, but he simply places her inside a hut. Then, the queen's son, the prince, goes on a hunt and finds Kohava, lying asleep in the hut. He falls in love with her, but she cannot awake. At any rate, the prince goes back home and tells his mother he is in love with a princess, and the queen gives him Kohava's necklace as a betrothal gift for his bride. The prince goes back to the hut and places the necklace around Kohava's neck. She wakes up sees the prince; they each relate the story, and the prince learns of his mother's cruelty. The prince announces he will marry, and asks his mother to prepare a grand celebration. The bride is walked in wearing seven veils, and, when she lifts them, the queen sees Kohava is alive and flees. Kohava and the prince live happily ever after. In his notes, Schwartz noted it to be a cross between European tales Snow White and Sleeping Beauty.

Male heroes
Lal Behari Dey collected a similar tale from Bengal in his work Folk-Tales of Bengal, albeit with a male hero. In this tale, Life's Secret, a king has two wives, Suo and Duo, both childless. One day, a fakeer goes to the palace to beg for alms, and is greeted by queen Suo, who gives him a handful of rice. In return, the fakeer gives her a nostrum, to be swallowed with the juice of a pomegranate flower; the queen will give birth to a son she will name Dalim Kumar ("Dalim" - pomegranate; "Kumar" - son). The fakeer also warns her that her son's life will be bound to a necklace of gold, inside a wooden box, inside a boal fish's heart that lives in a pool in the palace. In time, Suo gives birth to Dalim Kumar. The boy grows up and likes to play with pigeons. One day, a pigeon flies in Duo queen's quarters. Duo promises to return the pigeon if Dalim asks his mother the secret of this life. Dalim Kumar talks to his mother about it; at first, Suo relates in telling her son about it, but eventually concedes and tells him about the necklace. Dalim Kumar tells his step-mother about it. Duo begins a plan: with some herbs, she feigns that her bones are so frail that they crackle and pop, and her only cure is the boal fish. After the fish is caught, at the same time Dalim begins to feel unwell and, as the wooden box is open and Duo places Dalim's necklace around her neck, Dalim falls dead. The king's grief is so deep, and he orders his son's body to be placed in one of his garden-houses, with provisions, and trusts the son of his prime minister, Dalim Kumar's friend, with the keys to his tomb. Dalim Kumar wakes up at night while his step-mother does not wear the necklace, and dies in the daytime so long as Duo wears the necklace. After some time, the prime minister's son notices that, despite being dead, Dalim Kumar's body does not decay, and decides to investigate further. Dalim Kumar's friends discovers he is alive, and both plot to retrieve the necklace. Meanwhile, BIdhata-Purusha's sister gives birth to a daughter, and Bidhata-Purusha prophecises his niece shall marry a dead bridegroom. After she comes of age, her mother takes the girl with her to avoid her fate, and they reach Dalim Kumar's garden-palace. The girl enters the palace and meets Dalim Kumar, who claims to be her future dead bridegroom. Dalim Kumar's friend marries them and leaves them be. The next day, Dalim Kumar "dies" again, to his wife's consternation, but revives at night. The girl learns of his condition and, after some years, and the birth of their two children, decides to meet her step-mother-in-law and retrieve her husband's necklace. The girl disguises herself as a poor female barber and goes to Queen Duo's palace to hire herself. Unaware of the girl's identity, she takes her in as her servant. The girl instructs her elder son to play with the necklace around Duo's neck, and to cry if the boy parts with it. Duo lets the child play with the necklace, certain of her triumph. Dalim Kumar's wife steals the necklace and brings it back to her husband. Dalim Kumar, his friend and his family enter the king's palace with grandeur; the prince meets his parents and tells the whole truth. The king then sentences his queen Duo to be buried alive.

In a tale collected by Tapanmohan Chatterji with the title Dalim-Koumar ou Le Prince Grenade, a king has two queens, Suo and Duo. Suo has a child, while Duo is childless, and envies the other. Suo's son is named Dalim-Koumar, since his life is tied to a pomegranate. One day, one of Dalim's doves flies to Duo's room and she catches it. Duo promises to return it, if the boy reveals where his "life" is. The boy retorts that his life is inside him, but the queen explains that an astrologer told the boy's mother the boy's life is inside the pomegranate, and Duo wants to know where it is. Dalim runs to his mother to ask her about it and, despite some avoidance, Suo tells him the secret. Dalim goes to tell Duo the information. Some time later, queen Duo feigns illness, and she tells the king her only cure is a certain pomegranate on a certain tree that lies away from the village. The king's servant takes the pomegranate from the tree, which instantly causes the boy to fall ill. Duo cracks open the fruit and finds a little box with a golden necklace inside. She wears it on her neck and Dalim falls dead immediately. The king and Suo cry for their lost son, and order his body to be placed inside a white marbled pavillion. Meanwhile, Dalim Kumar's fiancée, a princess, prepares herself for the sati, but promises to defeat death by the strength of her love and by giving offerings to the gods. The princess decides to vigil his body alone, in the pavilion. All the while, queen Suo retires to her chambers out of grief, and Duo becomes the king's favourite, being showered with affection and jewels, but, in oder to avoid suspicions, takes off the necklace at night - which revives Dalim in his tomb. Thus, Dalim revives at night and dies in the morning. One day, Dalim Kumar awakes and sees the princess, his fiancée, in the pavilion, and they embrace. The prince tells the princess about the necklace, and she promises to fetch it and give it to him. After Dalim falls into a sleep again, the princess disguise herself as a barber woman and goes to queen Duo's palace. With a child in tandem, the princess convinces Duo to let the child play with the necklace. After fulfilling her task, the princess takes the necklace back to Dalim Kumar. He awakes and embraces his fiancée, thanking her for her help. The next day, Dalim Kumar and the princess enter his father's city to let him know his son is alive, and to punish the perfidious queen.

In a tale collected by author Mary Frere with the title Chundun Rajah, seven princes marry seven wives, who mistreat their sister-in-law, the princes' sister, except the seventh prince's wife. The women spread rumours about the princess until her brothers expel her from home. As a last humiliation, they shout at the princess to not return home until she marries Chundun Rajah ("King Sandlewood"), and when she does, to set wooden stools for them. The princess is given some food for the road, and finds a Rakshas's house. The Rakshas's pets, a little cat and a little dog, ask for some food and in returns let the princess take some of the Rakshas's antimony and saffron. Later, the princes finds a large tomb in the middle of the jungle, and enters it. The story then explains that the tomb belongs to Chundun Rajah: his family laid his body in the tomb, and, though many months have passed, his body has not decayed, because he comes alive at night and dies in the morning, and this only a Brahmin know. One night, Chundun Rajah wakes up and sees the princess. They tell each other their stories. Chundun Rajah marries the princess with the blessing of his Brahmin friend, and, one day, explains the origin of his malaise to the princess: a flying peri fell in love with Chundun Rajah, but he refused her advances, and, in vengeance, the peri stole the Chundun Har ("sandlewood necklace") that stored the youth's life within. In time, the princess gives birth to a boy, but, due to worry for her husband's state, she begins to fall ill. Their Brahmin friends suggests she seeks shelter with her relatives-in-law (Chundun Rajah's mother and sister), and to sit on a marble slab in their garden, which was Chundun's favourite. The princess takes her son and goes to her mother-in-law's palace to sit on the marble slab. Chundun Rajah's sisters notice her presence and go to talk to her, and notice that the little boy was very reminiscent of their dead brother. They take the princess and her son and give her a house to live in. Days pass, and Chundun Rajah's sisters hear some voices coming from the princess's house, and pay her a visit: they see their brother, Chundun Rajah, alive and well, and playing with his son. After a joyous reunion, Chundun Rajah tells them of the peri and the necklace. Some time later, Chundun Kumar is playing with his son in his wife's house, and the flying peris come in unseen, even the one wearing his necklace. Chundun's son sees that specific peri and tears off the necklace from her neck, making its beads fall to the ground. The peris fly out of the house, while the princess gathers the beads, rebuild the necklace and puts it on her husband's neck, ending his curse once and for all. Later, the princess invite her own brothers and their wives to her wedding to Chundun Rajah. Remembering her sisters-in-law's mocking remark, the princess has six of them sat on wooden stools, while the only one that was kind to her is given a better stool.

In a tale collected by Sunity Devi, Maharani of Coochbehar, with the title The Dead Prince, an astrologer has a sister. His sister gives birth to a girl and, after six days, asks her brother to predict her daughter's future - since, on the sixth day after birth, one's own future is written on their forehead by the Creator. The astrologer prophecizes that she will marry a dead man. Trying to avoid this fate, the girl's mother takes her daughter after she is 12 or 13 years old and wanders through a forest. Meanwhile, a Maharajah has two wives, a first Maharani with a son named Dalim Kumar, and a second Maharani, with no son. The second Maharani hates her step-son. One day, the prince is found dead, apparently he drowned while in the castle's grounds. The second Maharani suggests her husband burn the prince's body, but the boy's grieving mother asks her husband to build a palace to house the prince's body, with his instruments and provisions for 10 years. The Maharajah fulfills her request. Back the girl and her mother. they are still wandering through forests and jungle, and the girl says she is thirsty. The girl stops to rest by a tree, while her mother goes in front of her to find any water source. They get separated: the mother thinks she lost her daughter and returns home, while the girl reaches the palace in the jungle. While she is there, one evening, the prince awakes and sees her. Days, months pass, and the girl and prince begin to like each other and marry. One day, the girl, now a woman, asks the prince his story. He tells that an astrologer predicted at the time of his birth his destiny as a great ruler, if he lived, and gave his father a necklace (which was "his life"), with a warning to not allow anyone wear it around their neck. So, to protect his son, the Maharajah places the necklace in a golden box and hid in the depths of a pool in the palace. However, the Maharajah's second wife, who also knew of the necklace, and ordered the fisherman to catch the fish that swallowed the golden box. The second Maharani stole the necklace and wore it around her neck - and it has been like this since then: whenever she wears the necklace in the morning, the prince dies, but come night, she takes off the necklace and the prince is alive. After hearing the story, the prince's wife, then, promises to get back the necklace. Some time later, some of the Maharajah's huntsmen and sportsmen report back to him that the prince's palace is haunted, since they hear a woman's voice and a baby's cry. The Maharajah ponders that, if his son was alive, he would have married and fathered a child at that time, but dismisses the huntsmen's concerns. Back to the prince's wife, she takes her child, disguises herself as a poor woman ("naptini") and goes to her father-in-law's palace to hire herself as a servant to the second Maharani. She has the Maharani play with her child, while she paints her feet, and the baby plays with the necklace. The prince's wife steals the necklace and rushes back to Dalim Kumar's palace to give him. Later, Dalim Kumar is visited by his father and mother, who rejoice that their son is alive. The prince suggests they throw the necklace to the depths of the ocean. Finally, the girl's mother learns of her daughter's survival and her story, and thanks her brother for his prediction.

In a tale from Assam, titled The Dead Husband, a man named Bidhata ("destiny") rules over fate. After his sister gives birth to a girl, Bidhata predicts that the girl shall have no want of food and drink, but she shall marry a dead husband. Trying to avoid this fate, Bidhata's sisters take her daughter and wander off . They reach a large, uninhabited palace on the way, and the girl is impelled inside it, leaving her mother outside the palace door. Inside, the girl cries due to being separated from her mother, but, at night, a handsome youth appears to her. The youth assuages her fears, and tells her he will die in the morning. The girl becomes a woman, and lives with the youth. One day, the youth explains he is a prince; his mother placed a necklace on his neck; after his mother died, his father remarried, and his new step-mother hated the prince and stole his necklace, causing him to fall into a death-like sleep immediately. The prince's step-mother placed the necklace in a water jug, and he wishes someone can retrieve the necklace. The prince's wife takes their child and goes to her father-in-law's palace to steal the necklace. She enters service as a maid, and wins the queen's trust. After some time, she takes back the necklace and rushes back to her husband. He is given the necklace and comes alive again. The prince goes back to his father and tells him the whole story. The king executes his wife, and welcomes his son and daughter-in-law.

See also
 Momotaro
 The Sleeping Prince (fairy tale)
 Sleeping Beauty
 Snow White
 Syair Bidasari
 Udea and her Seven Brothers
 Uriko-hime

References 

Indian fairy tales
Fictional princesses
Female characters in fairy tales
Sleep in mythology and folklore
ATU 400-459